Landscape with Two Nymphs is a c.1659 oil-on-canvas painting by the French artist Nicolas Poussin. A late work, it seems to have been painted for Charles Le Brun, another painter. It was sold from the Radziwiłł collection in 1866 to Frédéric Reiset, a curator at the Louvre. Reiset sold it with the rest of his collection to Henri d'Orleans, Duke of Aumale in 1879 and so the work is now in the Musée Condé in Chantilly

Landscape art
Mythological paintings by Nicolas Poussin
1659 paintings
Paintings in the collection of the Musée Condé